Suman Rawat (born 6 March 1961) is an Indian former track and field athlete. She competed in the 3000 metres event and won bronze at the 1986 Asian Games and gold in the 1987 South Asian Games in the 1500 m and 3000 m events. She was conferred with the Arjuna award for her achievements. She hails from India's Himachal Pradesh State.

References 

1961 births
Recipients of the Arjuna Award
Indian female long-distance runners
20th-century Indian women
20th-century Indian people
Living people
Sportswomen from Himachal Pradesh
Asian Games medalists in athletics (track and field)
Athletes (track and field) at the 1986 Asian Games
South Asian Games medalists in athletics
Athletes from Himachal Pradesh
Asian Games bronze medalists for India
Medalists at the 1986 Asian Games